Dennis "Denny" James Biodrowski (June 27, 1940 – October 20, 2014) was an American football guard who played five seasons in the National Football League (NFL) for the Kansas City Chiefs from 1963 to 1967. He played in the 1966 AFL Championship game as well as Super Bowl I as substitutes and for special teams plays.

He was originally signed as a free agent. In October 2014, he died at the age of 74.

References 

1940 births
2014 deaths
Players of American football from Gary, Indiana
Kansas City Chiefs players
Memphis Tigers football players
American football offensive guards
American Football League players